U.S. Routes in Ohio are the components of the United States Numbered Highway System that are located in the U.S. state of Ohio. They are owned by the state, and maintained by the Ohio Department of Transportation (ODOT) except in cities.

U.S. Routes

Special routes

See also

References

 
U.S. Routes